Lanteira is a municipality located in the province of Granada, Spain. According to the 2004 census (INE), the city has a population of 507 inhabitants.

See also 
 List of municipalities in Granada
 Emirate of Granada
 Province of Spain
 Sierra Nevada National Park

References

Municipalities in the Province of Granada